Mindanao State University – Maguindanao (commonly referred to as MSU-Maguindanao) is a public coeducational institution of higher education and research located in the barangay Dalican, in the municipality of Datu Odin Sinsuat, Maguindanao, Philippines. It was founded on October 10, 1973  by Mindanao State University Board of Regents (BOR) through Resolution No.821 series of 1973.

History
Mindanao State University (MSU) Maguindanao is formerly known as MSU Dinaig Agricultural and Technical College (MSU- DATC). Dinaig is the former name Datu Odin Sinsuat until 1994. It was renamed by the virtue of Muslim Mindanao Autonomy Act No. 29 during the Second Assembly.

The campus began its operation in 1973 with only 7 faculty members, 15 administrative staff members, and 126 students. When it started it only offers three courses namely Agriculture, Forestry and Community Development. Early classes were held at the grandstand of Dalican (Poblacion) Pilot Elementary School. However, in 1975, all school facilities were razed by fire. It was in 1975, Dinaig former mayor Datu Odin Sinsuat partly donated and sold his 55-hectare property, which became it is present-day site.

MSU-Maguindanao was granted fiscal autonomy by virtue of BOR Resolution no. 48 in 1982. It was later renamed MSU-Maguindanao by virtue of BOR Resolution No.561, series of 1982.

Academic units
Currently, the campus offers seventeen (17) baccalaureate programs, five(5) graduate programs and six(6) Diploma courses divided into 8 academic units.
 
Graduate School
College of Agriculture
College of Arts and Sciences
College of Education
College of Fisheries
College of Forestry and Environmental   Studies
College of College of Public  Affairs and Governance
Integrated Laboratory Science High School

References

External links 

 MSU - Maguindanao official website 
 MSU - Main Campus official website 
 MSU - Iligan Institute of Technology official website
 MSU - General Santos City official website
 MSU - Naawan Campus official website
 MSU- Buug Campus official website

State universities and colleges in the Philippines
Mindanao Association State Colleges and Universities Foundation
Philippine Association of State Universities and Colleges
Research universities in the Philippines
 
Universities and colleges in Maguindanao del Norte
1973 establishments in the Philippines
Educational institutions established in 1973